Verkeerder Kill Falls is the highest waterfall in Sam's Point Preserve in the Shawangunk Mountains in the town of Shawangunk, Ulster County, New York. The waterfall is named after the stream. The waterfall may only be viewed from the top near an edge of a rocky outcrop.

References

External links 
Sam's Point Dwarf Pine Ridge Preserve

Waterfalls of New York (state)
Shawangunks
Landforms of Ulster County, New York
Shawangunk, New York
Wawarsing, New York